Sara Junevik (born 14 February 2000) is a Swedish swimmer. In 2021, she represented Sweden at the 2020 Summer Olympics held in Tokyo, Japan. She competed at the 2021 FINA World Swimming Championships (25 m).

References

External links
 Sara Junevik (official website)
 

2000 births
Living people
Swedish female butterfly swimmers
Swedish female freestyle swimmers
Place of birth missing (living people)
Swimmers at the 2018 Summer Youth Olympics
Youth Olympic gold medalists for Sweden
Swimmers at the 2020 Summer Olympics
Olympic swimmers of Sweden
21st-century Swedish women
European Aquatics Championships medalists in swimming
Medalists at the FINA World Swimming Championships (25 m)